Helvella crispa, also known as the white saddle, elfin saddle or common helvel, is an ascomycete fungus of the family Helvellaceae. The mushroom is readily identified by its irregularly shaped whitish cap, fluted stem, and fuzzy undersurfaces. It is found in eastern North America and in Europe, near deciduous trees in summer and autumn.

Etymology
The fungus was originally described as Phallus crispus by the naturalist Giovanni Antonio Scopoli in 1772. Its specific epithet is Latin adjective crispa 'wrinkled' or 'curly'. The generic name was originally a type of Italian herb but became associated with morels.

Description 

Helvella crispa is creamy white in colour, 6–13 cm (2½–5 in) in length, with a cap 2–5 cm (1–2 in) in diameter. It is striking due to its irregularly shaped lobes on the cap, but with a robust creamy-white base (2–8×1–2.5 cm in size). Its flesh is thin and brittle. The stem is 3–10 cm (1¼–4 in) long, white or pinkish in colour and ornately ribbed. It gives off a pleasant aroma, but is not edible raw. The spore print is white, the oval spores average 19 x 11.5 μm. Occasionally white capped forms are found. It can be distinguished from occasional white forms of Helvella lacunosa by its furry cap undersurface and inrolled margins when young.

Distribution and habitat
Helvella crispa grows in grass as well as in humid hardwoods, such as beech, (not so well in resinous ones) along the side of pathways, in hedges and on the talus of meadows. They can be spotted from the end of summer until the end of autumn.

It is found in China, Japan, Europe and eastern North America, though is replaced by the related Helvella lacunosa in western parts.

Edibility

Although some guidebooks list this species as edible, there is speculation that it may contains monomethylhydrazine, which can cause severe  intoxication, and may be carcinogenic. It has been reported to cause gastrointestinal symptoms when eaten raw.

References

External links
Helvella crispa on Mushroomexpert.com

crispa
Fungi of Asia
Fungi of Europe
Fungi described in 1822
Fungi of North America